Aureolaria flava, commonly called smooth yellow false foxglove, is a species of plant in the broomrape family that is native to the eastern United States.

It is a perennial that produces yellow flowers in the late summer on herbaceous stems.

References

Flora of North America
flava